Michael Colgan may refer to:

Michael Colgan (actor), Northern Irish actor
Michael Colgan (nutritionist),  biochemist and physiologist nutritionist
Michael Colgan (director) (born 1950), Irish theatre director and producer
Michael Colgan (politician) (died 1953), Irish independent politician